WPEX was an adult hits-formatted broadcast radio station licensed to Kenbridge, Virginia, serving Eastern Lunenburg County, Virginia and Northwestern Brunswick County, Virginia. WPEX was last owned and operated by Seaview Communications Inc.

WPEX's license was deleted on December 10, 2021, due to the station having been silent for more than twelve months.

References

External links
 90.9 WPEX Online
 

PEX
Radio stations established in 1994
Radio stations disestablished in 2021
1994 establishments in Virginia
2021 disestablishments in Virginia
Defunct radio stations in the United States
PEX